Contrary is a San Francisco-based venture capital firm. Formed in 2016, the firm invests across early stage companies in North America and India. Select investments from the firm include DoorDash, Anduril, Ramp, Zepto, and Vise.

Background 
The firm was founded by Eric Tarczynski in 2016. During that year, Tarczynski drove across the United States recruiting "venture partners" involved in the startup ecosystem. More than 50 universities were represented by venture partners by early 2017. For his work founding Contrary, Tarczynski was awarded the 2022 Forbes 30 Under 30 honor in the Venture Capital category.

Investors in Contrary include Tesla co-founder Martin Eberhard, Reddit co-founder Steve Huffman, Twitch co-founder Emmett Shear, Twitter ex-CEO Parag Agrawal, Meta Chief Product Officer Chris Cox, and GitHub COO Erica Brescia.

Investments 
Contrary's current investments include DoorDash, Anduril, Ramp, Vise, Kyte, Maev, Memora Health, Check, Stytch, Hallow, Parfait, and Zepto among others.

In October 2018, Contrary announced a $2.2 million Fund I.

In July 2020, the firm announced Contrary Talent, a network of engineers, designers, product managers, and operators. The network supports members through job opportunities, career development, and funding should they start a company.

In July 2020, Contrary launched Gap Year, a program that gave select founders $100,000 each given they took leave of absence from their university to start a company. This program incubated Zepto, a grocery delivery company based in India. Zepto has since raised $160 million, including funding from Y Combinator and Breyer Capital.

In October 2021, Contrary announced a $20 million Fund II. Five months later in March 2022, Contrary announced that they had closed a $75 million Fund III.

References 

Venture capital firms
Venture capital firms of the United States
Companies based in San Francisco
Financial services companies established in 2016
2016 establishments in California